Gilfrid Lawson may refer to:

Sir Gilfrid Lawson, 6th Baronet (1675–1749)
Sir Gilfrid Lawson, 9th Baronet (–1794)